Pilodeudorix canescens is a butterfly in the family Lycaenidae. It is found in the Democratic Republic of the Congo (Kinshasa, Lulua and Sankuru), western Uganda and north-western Tanzania. The habitat consists of primary forests.

References

Butterflies described in 1921
Deudorigini